Las Aventuras de Pikín is a 1977 Argentine family adventure film directed and written by Alberto Abdala with Jorge Falcón. The cinematography was performed by Américo Hoss.

Cast
Jorge Barreiro
Horacio Bruno
Osvaldo María Cabrera
Rey Charol
Rolando Chávez
Cristina Del Valle
Coco Fossati
Vicente La Russa
Marcelo Marcote
Reynaldo Mompel
Arturo Noal
Raúl Ricutti
Mario Savino
Oscar Viale

External links
 

1977 films
1970s Spanish-language films
1970s adventure films
Argentine adventure films
1970s Argentine films